The Kakusei (鶴聖) was a Go competition in Japan.

Past winners

Go competitions in Japan